The Prix Edmond Blanc is a Group 3 flat horse race in France open to thoroughbreds aged four years or older. It is run over a distance of 1,600 metres (about 1 mile) at Saint-Cloud in late March or early April.

History
The event is named after Edmond Blanc (1856–1920), a leading racehorse owner who founded Saint-Cloud Racecourse. It was established in 1921, and was originally open to horses aged three or older. It was initially contested over 1,500 metres.

The first winner of the race was owned by Edmond Blanc's widow. Her horse carried the racing colours inherited from her husband, orange jersey and blue cap.

The Prix Edmond Blanc was abandoned throughout World War II, with no running from 1940 to 1945. It was extended to 1,600 metres in 1954.

The race was closed to three-year-olds in 1962. It was cancelled due to bad weather in 1963, 1970 and 1971.

Records
Most successful horse (2 wins):
 Dictateur VIII – 1929, 1931
 Manitou III – 1949, 1950
 Franc Luron – 1959, 1960
 Gris de Gris – 2009, 2010
 The Revenant - 2019, 2022

Leading jockey (6 wins):
 Christophe Soumillon – Bedawin (2002), My Risk (2004), Skins Game (2011), Moonwalk in Paris (2012), Stormy Antartic (2018), The Revenant (2022)

Leading trainer (4 wins):
 André Fabre – Crystal Glitters (1984), French Stress (1989), Dansili (2000), Jimmy Two Times (2017)
 Jean-Claude Rouget – Skins Game (2011), Moonwalk in Paris (2012), Silas Marner (2013), Wally (2021)

Leading owner (4 wins):
 Marcel Boussac – Zariba (1923), Goyescas (1933), Negundo (1935), Goya II (1939)
 Jean Stern – Sanguinetto (1937), Salieri (1938), Franc Luron (1959, 1960)

Winners since 1981

Earlier winners

 1921: Le Filon
 1922: Bahadur
 1923: Zariba
 1924: Niceas
 1925: Premontre
 1926: Brumaire
 1927: King Arthur
 1928: Orosmade
 1929: Dictateur VIII
 1930: Mysarch
 1931: Dictateur VIII
 1932: Tapinois
 1933: Goyescas
 1934: Le Centaure
 1935: Negundo
 1936: Monarkie
 1937: Sanguinetto
 1938: Salieri
 1939: Goya II
 1940–45: no race
 1946: Sayani
 1947: Chanteur
 1948: Menetrier
 1949: Manitou III
 1950: Manitou III
 1951: Buffalo Bill
 1952: Orneiro
 1953: Faubourg
 1954: Fine Top
 1955:
 1956: Beau Prince
 1957: Tenareze
 1958: Blockhaus
 1959: Franc Luron
 1960: Franc Luron
 1961: Fin Bec
 1962: Bobar
 1963: no race
 1964: Prima Donna
 1965: Astaria
 1966: Dschingis Khan
 1967: A Tempo
 1968: Martel
 1969: Semillant
 1970–71: no race
 1972: Marinover
 1973: La Troublerie
 1974: El Rastro
 1975: Afayoon
 1976: Full of Hope
 1977: Baly Rockette
 1978: Sanedtki
 1979: Weth Nan
 1980: Wolverton

See also
 List of French flat horse races

References

 France Galop / Racing Post:
 france-galop.com – A Brief History: Prix Edmond Blanc.
 galop.courses-france.com – Prix Edmond Blanc – Palmarès depuis 1980.
 galopp-sieger.de – Prix Edmond Blanc.
 horseracingintfed.com – International Federation of Horseracing Authorities – Prix Edmond Blanc (2019).
 pedigreequery.com – Prix Edmond Blanc – Saint-Cloud.

Open mile category horse races
Saint-Cloud Racecourse
Horse races in France
1921 establishments in France
Recurring sporting events established in 1921